Constitution of 1830 may refer to:

Charter of 1830 in France
Constitution of Ecuador of 1830
Constitution of Uruguay of 1830
Constitution of Venezuela of 1830